is a Japanese voice actor affiliated with Aptepro. His main roles include Kyohei Kashihara in Arpeggio of Blue Steel, Sosuke Sugaya in Assassination Classroom, Hajun in Kajiri Kamui Kagura, Airzel in Bakugan, Papa in Higepiyo, Kenji Ito in Horizon in the Middle of Nowhere, Gen Shishio in Kekkaishi, and Takeo Tsurumaru in Shadow Star.

Career
When Miyashita was a child, he admired Kōichi Yamadera, who played Kurama Wataribe in Mashin Hero Wataru, and decided to become a voice actor in his third year of high school. On the recommendation of his parents, he enrolled in a university in Nara, but he could not give up his dream of becoming a voice actor, so he dropped out after one year and attended Yoyogi Animation Academy in Osaka while working part-time. On the advice of a lecturer at Yoyogi Animation Academy, he entered the training school of Ken Production in the Kanto region, and began working as a voice actor around the age of 22 when he was placed under the care of the office.

In 2007, he attracted attention for playing three completely different types of characters: the role of Gen Shishio in Kekkaishi, the role of Predator in Bakugan Battle Brawlers, and the role of Raphael in Teenage Mutant Ninja Turtles. Afterwards, he left Ken Production in 2008 and worked as a freelancer until June 2009, but after belonging to Production Baobab from July 2009 to August 2011, he started working as a freelancer again in September 2011.

Miyashita has been a member of Aptepro since February 2013. As part of his activities, he has formed a recital theater unit called "Lit Klatch" (formerly "LK VI").

In an interview with Girs-Style, Miyashita said that he doesn't remember exactly the first job he got, but it was probably a Western movie. He recalled that the first role he remembered was an unnamed character in Big Wolf on Campus, and that the first named role was Takeo Tsurumaru in Shadow Star. In the aforementioned interview, Miyashita said that he was advised by a Western film dubbing director to just be there as the character and not to think too much about the role, and he felt that well thought out words are not convincing. He said that he tried to concentrate on the role rather than doing calculations, and that he did not remember much about his roles after performing them.

Filmography

Anime
2003
Narutaru as Takeo Tsurumaru

2005
Black Cat as Victor
Immortal Grand Prix as Glass Jones

2006
Innocent Venus as Kaneda
Nana as Nakamura
Yomigaeru Sora – Rescue Wings as Hitoshi Tsujido, Kazushi Sugiura, Oyama, Sawada

2007
Bakugan Battle Brawlers as Predator
Dragonaut: The Resonance as Keiichi Amagi
Kaze no Stigma as Tsang
Kekkaishi as Gen Shishio
Reideen as Toshihisa Takahashi
Romeo × Juliet as Vittorio, Paolo

2008
Nogizaka Haruka no Himitsu as Nagai

2009
Black God as Raiga
The Girl Who Leapt Through Space as Uno, Koga, Wanibuchi
Nogizaka Haruka no Himitsu: Purezza as Nagai
Sōten Kōro as Liu Xie
Yu-Gi-Oh! 5D's as Ramon

2010
Bakugan Battle Brawlers: New Vestroia as Predator
Shiki as Sadafumi Tamo

2011
Bakugan: Gundalian Invaders as Airzel, Lythirius
Fairy Tail as Hughes
Fractale as Takamy
Future Diary as Kobayashi, Detective Suzuki, Itabashi, Mr. Moriya, Rocky, Shiraishi, Ushio Gasai
Horizon in the Middle of Nowhere as Kenji Ito, Yasumasa Sakakibara
Last Exile: Fam, the Silver Wing as Hector, Oscar, Rakesh
Mayo Chiki! as Jirō Sakamachi
Nurarihyon no Mago as Do-Hiko

2012
The Ambition of Oda Nobuna as Shokakuin Gosei
Accel World as Sand Duct, Sugeno, Yūya Kamioka
Detective Conan as Sumio Fujinami 
Fairy Tail as Nullpudding, Rocker, Velveno
Horizon in the Middle of Nowhere Season 2 as Kenji Ito
Hyōka as Oda, Naoki Goto
Ixion Saga DT as Limpus
Sankarea: Undying Love as Edogawa

2013
Arpeggio of Blue Steel ~Ars Nova~ as Kyōhei Kashihara
Devil Survivor 2 The Animation as Bifrons
Fairy Tail as Jiemma
Log Horizon as Londark, Schreider
Sasami-san@Ganbaranai as Awajima

2014
Buddy Complex as Soeharto, Green
Dragonar Academy as Klaus Witershausen
Dramatical Murder as Koujaku (young)
Tokyo ESP as Yoshito Sorimachi

2015
Assassination Classroom as Sōsuke Sugaya
Log Horizon 2 as Londark
Ninja Slayer From Animation as Daedalus
The Rolling Girls as Marukome
Yamada-kun and the Seven Witches as Miyashita

2016
Assassination Classroom 2nd Season as Sōsuke Sugaya
Kiznaiver as Yoshizawa
Mobile Suit Gundam Unicorn RE:0096 as Marco
Poco's Udon World as Matsunaga
Tanaka-kun is Always Listless as Inokuma
Tōken Ranbu: Hanamaru as Iwatooshi and Jiroutachi

2017
Time Bokan 24 as Simplicio

2018
Happy Sugar Life as Shio and Asahi's father

2019
Midnight Occult Civil Servants as Maki

2021
Seven Knights Revolution: Hero Successor as Castor

2022
To Your Eternity Second Season as Messar Robin Bastar

Video games
Toukiden 2 as Homura
Xenoblade Chronicles as Reyn
Xenoblade Chronicles X as Custom Male Avatar
Touken Ranbu as Iwatooshi and Jiroutachi
The King of Fighters XIV as Bandeiras Hattori
Dragon Nest as Rubinart
Kajiri Kamui Kagura as Hajun

Theatrical animation
 Dragon Age: Dawn of the Seeker as Anthony Pentaghast
 Pokémon: Lucario and the Mystery of Mew as Regirock

Drama CD
 The Comic Artist and Assistants as Kazuma Tsuranuki

Dubbing

Live-action
 Adam Hicks
 Zeke and Luther as Luther Waffles
 Pair of Kings as King Boz
 Lemonade Mouth as Wen Gifford
 17 Again as Stan (Hunter Parrish)
 31 as Doom-Head (Richard Brake)
 Collide as Matthias (Marwan Kenzari)
 Friday the 13th as Chewie (Aaron Yoo)
 Hannah Montana as Cooper Montgomery (Andre Kinney)
 Hawthorne as Miles Bourdet (Derek Luke)
 Hostel as Alexei
 I, Robot as Farber (Shia LaBeouf)
 Jurassic World Dominion as Rainn Delacourt (Scott Haze)
 The Last Song as Scott
 Primeval as Connor Temple (Andrew-Lee Potts)
 The Social Network as Billy Olson (Bryan Barter)

Animation
 Hoodwinked Too! Hood vs. Evil as Wolf W. Wolf
 Meet the Robinsons as Frankie
 Mighty Magiswords as Prohyas Warrior
 Ratatouille as Lalo
 Ruby Gloom episode "Skull in the Family" as Skull Roy
 Teenage Mutant Ninja Turtles as Raphael
 TMNT as Raphael

References

External links
 

1978 births
Living people
Japanese male video game actors
Japanese male voice actors
Male voice actors from Hyōgo Prefecture
21st-century Japanese male actors